Wilbur Fisk Sanders (May 2, 1834 – July 7, 1905) was a United States senator from Montana.  A leading pioneer and a skilled lawyer, Sanders played a prominent role in the development of Montana Territory and the state's early political history.

Early life
Sanders was born in Leon, Cattaraugus County, New York, to Ira and Freedom (Edgerton) Sanders. His father was a farmer originally from Rhode Island, and his mother a native of Connecticut. Being a devout Methodist, Ira Sanders named his firstborn son after a hero of his faith, the founding president of Wesleyan University, Willbur Fisk (the name was often misspelled by his contemporaries with one "l," instead of two). Family stories tell of a precocious child displaying a keen intellect and studious character. Wilbur attended the common schools in New York and afterward taught school himself.

Following his mother's wishes, Sanders moved to Akron, Ohio, in 1854, where he continued teaching and studied law under his uncle, Sidney Edgerton.  His Uncle Sidney, 16 years his elder, exercised a profound impact on his life. Also born in western New York, Edgerton had moved to Akron ten years earlier and rose to prominence under the tutelage of the veteran Ohio politician and lawyer Rufus P. Spalding.  Edgerton likewise took Sanders under his wing.  Sanders gained admission to the bar in 1856, and he and Edgerton soon entered a law partnership.  Edgerton had become involved with the Free Soil Party in the 1840s, and by the mid-1850s, around the time Sanders joined him in Akron when his political activities had shifted to the fledgling Republican Party.  Sanders followed his uncle's political development.

On October 27, 1858, Sanders married Harriet P. Fenn, a native of Ohio. They had five children, but only three survived into adulthood: James, Wilbur E., and Louis.

Civil War
During the Civil War, he recruited a company of infantry and a battery of artillery in the summer of 1861 and was commissioned a first lieutenant in the 64th Regiment, Ohio Infantry, of which he was made adjutant. Sanders served in the Battle of Shiloh, and later in 1862, he assisted in the construction of defenses along the railroads south of Nashville. His family reported that he resigned from the army in August 1862 following an illness aggravated by a wound. He returned to his family in Akron, Ohio.

Montana Territory
He settled in that part of Idaho Territory, which later became Montana, where he engaged in the practice of law and also became interested in mining and stock raising. He was a young lawyer when he moved to Montana (Bannack) in 1863.  He was there before courts were organized and, being one of the first permanent settlers, took a prominent part in bringing law and order to Montana. He was a prosecutor for the infamous Montana Vigilantes who took the law into their own hands after over one hundred men had been ambushed and murdered for their gold in Virginia City, Montana. In December 1863, Sanders led the prosecution of George Ives as the murderer of Nicolas Tiebolt in Nevada City, Montana. Ives was convicted and hanged on December 21, 1863. The George Ives trial initiated a period of vigilantism that eventually brought an end to thefts and murders by "road agents" in the Virginia City region.  Sanders was one of the five original organizers of the Alder Gulch Vigilance Committee, which was formed on December 23, 1863 in Virginia City, Montana.

In his career as an attorney, Sanders gained a reputation for representing minority defendants, including Chinese and Indians. In a sensational 1881 trial, Sanders led the defense for Ah Wah and Ah Yen, Chinese miners on trial for murder. Sanders argued reasonable doubt and lack of evidence, and the Montana Territorial Supreme Court acquitted the defendants.

In 1873, Sanders became a member of the Territorial Legislature. Also, he realized the importance of preserving early records and was for thirty years the president of the Montana Historical Society, established in 1865. He accumulated newspapers and documents in his law office.  Sanders was a founding member of the Society of Montana Pioneers and served as its secretary (1884) and president (1888).  

He was a Republican candidate for election in 1864, 1867, 1880, and 1886 as a United States Representative and was a member of the Territorial House of Representatives of Montana from 1873 to 1879.

Upon the admission of Montana as a State into the Union, he was elected as a Republican to the US Senate and served from January 1, 1890, to March 3, 1893. While in the Senate, he was the chairman of the Committee on Enrolled Bills in the Fifty-second Congress.

In the 1890s, Sanders represented the Chinese community in Butte, Montana, against labor unions boycotting Chinese businesses.

Sanders died in Helena, Montana, at 71, and was interred in Forestvale Cemetery there. Sanders County, Montana, is named in his honor.

Notes

External links
  Retrieved on 2008-10-19
 Montana: The Magazine of Western History,  Autumn 2005  by Aarstad, Rich
 Helena: Her Historic Homes, Vol. II By Jean Baucus

1834 births
1905 deaths
People from Cattaraugus County, New York
American people of English descent
Montana Republicans
Republican Party United States senators from Montana
Members of the Montana Territorial Legislature
19th-century American politicians
American prosecutors
Politicians from Akron, Ohio
Politicians from Helena, Montana
Ohio lawyers
People of the American Old West
Montana pioneers
People of Ohio in the American Civil War
Union Army officers